Vartha is a 1986 Indian Malayalam-language film, directed by I. V. Sasi and produced by P. V. Gangadharan. The film stars Mammootty, Mohanlal, Rahman, Seema, Venu Nagavally, K. P. A. C. Lalitha and Prathapachandran. The film has musical score by A. T. Ummer. The film was successful at the box office. The film was remade in Tamil as Palaivana Rojakkal (1986), and in Hindi as Jai Shiv Shankar, which never released.

Plot

Cast 

Mammootty as Madhavan Kutty
Mohanlal as Parol Vasu
Rahman as Unnikrishnan
Seema as Radha Menon IAS
Nalini as Vasanthi
Venu Nagavally as Devan
Prathapachandran as Nambeeshan
Devan as Revenue Minister Philip
T. G. Ravi as Manikyam Kumar
Janardhanan as James
K. P. A. C. Lalitha as Kunjulakshmi
 Manavalan Joseph as Constable 
Jagannatha Varma as Kurup
Babu Namboothiri as Venu
Thikkurissy Sukumaran Nair as Keshavan Nair
K. P. A. C. Sunny as Enforcement Officer
K. P. A. C. Azeez as City Police Commissioner
Balan K. Nair as Forest Minister
Kuthiravattam Pappu as Hamsa
Kundara Johny as Francis
Paravoor Bharathan as Bharathan
Kunjandi as Pachu Pillai
Nellikode Bhaskaran as Radha's Relative
 Sonia as Young Radha
 Santhakumari as Ammukutty
 K. T. C. Abdullah  uncredited roll
 Baskara Kurup as Hajyar
 V. Ramachandran as Engineer Sahadevan

Themes 
Vartha is about the freedom of the press, and the "struggle between corrupt politicians and angry heroes". Sreedhar Pillai of India Today wrote, "Vartha had overtly political themes, parodying events and politicians in a manner that left little to the imagination. I. V. Sasi in an interview stated that: "I always have a rough commercial framework for my political films, Then I look around and talk to a lot of people about current political happenings. These, when mixed in the right proportion can give you an instant hit."

Release
The film was released on 12 February 1986.

Box office
The film was a commercial success, running for 150 days in theatres. The film was the third highest grossing Malayalam film of the year 1986.

Soundtrack 
The music was composed by A. T. Ummer and the lyrics were written by Bichu Thirumala.

Awards
Filmfare Award for Best Film - Malayalam won by P. V. Gangadharan (1986)

References

External links 
 

1986 films
1980s Malayalam-language films
Indian political films
Indian political thriller films
Malayalam films remade in other languages
Films directed by I. V. Sasi